Little Lord Fauntleroy is a 1921 American silent drama film directed by Alfred E. Green and Jack Pickford and starring the latter's elder sister Mary Pickford as both Cedric Errol and Widow Errol. The film is based on the 1886 novel of the same name by Frances Hodgson Burnett. A statue depicting Pickford's role exists today on the facade of New York City's landmarked I. Miller Building.

Plot summary 
Cedric Errol is a poor American boy who finds out that he is the sole heir to a wealthy British earldom and thus becomes Lord Fauntleroy.

Cast
 Mary Pickford as Cedric Errol and his mother Mrs Errol
 Claude Gillingwater as Earl of Dorincourt
 Joseph J. Dowling as William Havisham
 James A. Marcus as Hobbs
 Kate Price as Mrs. McGinty
 Fred Malatesta as Dick
 Rose Dione as Minna
 Arthur Thalasso as The Stranger
 Colin Kenny as Bevis
 Emmett King as Reverend Mr Mordaunt

A young Milton Berle appears in an uncredited role.

See also
 Little Lord Fauntleroy (1936)
 Little Lord Fauntleroy (1980)

References

External links 

 
 
 
 
  Little Lord Fauntleroy at SilentEra
 

1921 films
1921 drama films
Silent American drama films
American silent feature films
American black-and-white films
Films based on American novels
Films based on British novels
Films based on works by Frances Hodgson Burnett
Films directed by Alfred E. Green
United Artists films
Films set in England
Films with screenplays by Bernard McConville
1920s English-language films
1920s American films